Euonymus javanicus is a species of plant in the family Celastraceae. It is found in Malaysia and Singapore.

References

javanicus
Least concern plants
Taxonomy articles created by Polbot